The Coghinas is a river of northern Sardinia, Italy.

The Coghinas's springs are located on the Mountains of Alà, in the province Olbia-Tempio; after crossing the Anglona traditional region in its later course, it flows into the Gulf of Asinara in the area of the towns of Badesi and Valledoria.

In order to capture excess water for use when needed, and for flood control and electricity generation, two dams have been built, which have created the Lake Coghinas and the Lake of Casteldoria.

See also
Lake Coghinas

Rivers of Italy
Rivers of Sardinia
Rivers of the Province of Sassari
European drainage basins of the Mediterranean Sea